Caladenia montana, commonly known as the mountain spider orchid is a plant in the orchid family Orchidaceae and is endemic to New South Wales, Victoria and the Australian Capital Territory. It is a ground orchid with a single leaf and a single greenish-cream to cream flower, sometimes with reddish markings. It only grows in high montane forests.

Description
Flowering occurs from November to January.

Taxonomy and naming
Caladenia montana  was first formally described in 1991 by Geoffrey Carr and the description was published in Indigenous Flora and Fauna Association Miscellaneous Paper 1. The specific epithet (montana) is a Latin word meaning "of mountains".

Distribution and habitat

Conservation
Caladenia montana  is listed as  "vulnerable" under the New South Wales Government Threatened Species Conservation Act 1995. The main threats to the species are weed invasion, trampling and grazing by cattle, wild horses and pigs.

References

montana
Plants described in 1991
Endemic orchids of Australia
Orchids of the Australian Capital Territory
Orchids of New South Wales
Orchids of Victoria (Australia)